Anthia prevoili is a species of ground beetle in the subfamily Anthiinae. It was described by Lucas in 1881.

References

Anthiinae (beetle)
Beetles described in 1881